John Brody Malone (born January 7, 2000) is an American artistic gymnast who represented the United States at the 2020 Summer Olympics. He is the 2022 World Champion on horizontal bar and is the 2021 and 2022 U.S. National Champion.  He is a ten-time NCAA National Champion and is the 2021 World Championships bronze medalist on horizontal bar.

Personal life 
Malone was born in Johnson City, Tennessee, on January 7, 2000, to John and Tracy Malone.  He has two brothers and one sister. Malone's parents enrolled him in gymnastics at age three because he was a very active child. Malone's mother died of cancer in 2012, and his step-mother died in 2019 after suffering a brain aneurysm. Throughout middle school and high school Malone competed in rodeo events such as team roping and jackpots, similar to his father, who competed in rodeo at Georgia Southern University.

Malone studies engineering and management at Stanford University.

Gymnastics career

Junior

2015–16 
Malone competed at the Junior Olympic level.  At the 2015 National Championships he placed seventh. At the 2016 National Championships he placed second behind Vitaliy Guimaraes.  Additionally Malone won silver on vault and parallel bars and bronze on rings.

Malone competed at his first elite National Championships in 2016.  He placed 15th in the all-around but won bronze on horizontal bar in the 15–16 age division.

2017–18 
Malone competed at the 2017 Junior Olympic National Championships where he won silver in the all-around behind Bennet Huang. He next competed at the 2017 U.S. National Championships.  After two days of competition Malone won the all-around competition.  He also won gold on floor exercise, pommel horse, parallel bars, and horizontal bar. Malone was later selected to represent the US at the International Junior Gymnastics Competition in Japan. While there he placed fourth in the all-around but won silver on horizontal bar.

In January 2018 Malone competed at the RD761 International Junior Team Cup where he helped USA finish third in the team competition.  Individually he finished sixth in the all-around and won silver on horizontal bar and third on rings.

Senior

2019 
Malone began competing for the Stanford Cardinal gymnastics team in 2019.  At the NCAA National Championships Malone helped Stanford win the team title and individually he won the all-around, floor exercise, and horizontal bar titles. Malone was selected to represent the US at the 2019 Pan American Games where he helped the USA finish second as a team behind Brazil.

2020–21 
In early 2020 Malone competed at the Winter Cup where he finished third in the all-around. The NCAA season was cut short due to the ongoing COVID-19 pandemic.
 
Malone returned to competition at the 2021 NCAA Championships where he helped Stanford defend their team title.  He additionally defended his all-around and horizontal bar titles and won silver on rings. At the 2021 U.S. National Championships he won his first senior all-around title, defeating six-time national champion Sam Mikulak. As a result, he qualified to compete at the upcoming Olympic Trials. Malone clinched his spot on the Olympic team by finishing first in the all-around at the Olympic Trials. Malone was joined by Yul Moldauer, Sam Mikulak, and Shane Wiskus to form the United States men's Olympic gymnastics team.

During qualification at the Olympic Games Malone finished 11th overall and qualified for the all-around final and additionally qualified for the horizontal bar final in fourth. During the team final Malone helped the United States place fifth. During the all-around final Malone finished tenth; however he successfully competed his new skill on the parallel bars, a shoot up to handstand and fall back to support with ¾ turn mount, which will bear his name in the code of points.

In October Malone competed at the 2021 World Championships where he opted to only compete on the horizontal bar.  He qualified to the event final in fourth place.  During the event final he scored 14.966 and finished third behind Hu Xuwei and Daiki Hashimoto.

2022 
In February Malone competed at the Cottbus World Cup where he advanced to the pommel horse, rings, parallel bars, and horizontal bar event finals.  On the first day of event finals Malone won bronze on pommel horse behind Filip Ude and Illia Kovtun and placed sixth on rings.  On the second day he won bronze on parallel bars behind Kovtun and Mitchell Morgans and won gold on the horizontal bar.  Malone next competed at the DTB Pokal Team Challenge in Stuttgart alongside Vitaliy Guimaraes, Asher Hong, Yul Moldauer, and Khoi Young; they finished first as a team.

Malone was awarded the Nissen Emery Award, the highest honor in college men's gymnastics.  At the NCAA Championship Malone helped Stanford defend their national title.  Additionally he defended his high bar title, co-won gold on pommel horse, won bronze on floor exercise, and placed second in the all-around behind Paul Juda after a subpar routine on parallel bars.

In June Malone was selected to represent the United States at the Pan American Championships alongside Riley Loos, Yul Moldauer, Colt Walker, and Shane Wiskus.  On the first day of competition Malone competed on pommel horse, rings, parallel bars, and horizontal bar to help qualify the United States in first place to the team final.  Individually he won gold on horizontal bar and recorded the third highest parallel bars score but did not medal due to two-per country limitations and teammates Moldauer and Walker scoring higher.  During the team final Malone competed on pommel horse, rings, vault, and horizontal bar to help the USA win gold ahead of the reigning team champion Brazil.

In late July Malone competed at the U.S. Classic where he won the all-around title with a score of 88.558 (86.000 without bonus).  Additionally he posted the top horizontal bar score, second highest rings score, and third highest pommel horse and parallel bars score.  In August Malone competed at the U.S. National Championships where he won his second consecutive national all-around title.  As a result he and second place finisher Donnell Whittenburg were selected to represent the United States at the upcoming World Championships.  Additionally Malone placed first on floor exercise and horizontal bar, second on pommel horse, seventh on rings, eighth on vault, and fifth on parallel bars.

In September Malone competed at the Paris World Challenge Cup.  He qualified to the rings, parallel bars, and horizontal bar event finals.  Although he withdrew from the rings final, he won gold on horizontal bar and silver on parallel bars behind Caio Souza.

At the 2022 World Championships Malone qualified to the all-around and horizontal bar finals.  During the team final he contributed scores on all apparatuses towards the USA's fifth place finish.  During the all-around final Malone finished in fourth place, three-tenths of a point behind third place finisher Wataru Tanigawa.  During the horizontal bar final Malone beat Daiki Hashimoto by 0.1 point, and became the second American to win a world gold on the apparatus after Kurt Thomas did so in 1979.

Eponymous skills

Competitive history

References

External links
 
 

2000 births
Living people
People from Summerville, Georgia
American male artistic gymnasts
Stanford Cardinal men's gymnasts
Gymnasts at the 2019 Pan American Games
Pan American Games silver medalists for the United States
Pan American Games medalists in gymnastics
Medalists at the 2019 Pan American Games
Medalists at the World Artistic Gymnastics Championships
World champion gymnasts
Gymnasts at the 2020 Summer Olympics
Olympic gymnasts of the United States
Originators of elements in artistic gymnastics
21st-century American people